The 1955 Idaho Vandals football team represented the University of Idaho in the 1955 college football season. The Vandals were led by second-year head coach Skip Stahley and were members of the Pacific Coast Conference. Home games were played on campus at Neale Stadium in Moscow, with one home game in Boise at old Bronco Stadium at Boise Junior College.

Idaho compiled a 2–7 overall record and lost all four games in the PCC. After seven losses to open, including three straight shutouts, they won their last two games.
 
The Vandals lost the Battle of the Palouse with neighbor Washington State, blanked 0–9 at home on October 15. Idaho won the previous year in Pullman, the first win over the Cougars since 1925; the next came in 1964. In the rivalry game with Montana, Idaho ran its  winning streak over the Grizzlies to four and retained the Little Brown Stein.

Notable players
This Vandal team had two sophomores who went on to extended careers in professional football.

Jerry Kramer of Sandpoint played eleven seasons at right guard with the Green Bay Packers and won five NFL titles (and the first two Super Bowls) under head coach Vince Lombardi. He was an All-Pro five times and was the lead blocker on the famous Packers sweep. Kramer made the NFL's all-decade team for the 1960s and was the last member of the NFL's 50th anniversary team to be inducted into the Pro Football Hall of Fame, at age 82 in 2018.

Wayne Walker of Boise played fifteen seasons with the Detroit Lions as an outside linebacker and was named All-Pro three times. Both were selected in the fourth round of the 1958 NFL Draft; Kramer was 39th overall and Walker 45th, and both were periodic placekickers as pros. (As Vandals, Kramer was the kicker and Walker was the long snapper.)

Schedule

 One game was played on Friday (BYU at Provo, afternoon)

All-conference
No Vandals were on the All-PCC team or the second team. Honorable mention were fullback Wilbur Gary and sophomore center Wayne Walker.

NFL Draft
No Vandals were selected in the 1956 NFL Draft.

One junior from the 1955 Vandals was selected in the 1957 NFL Draft:

Five sophomores were selected in the 1958 NFL Draft:

List of Idaho Vandals in the NFL Draft

References

External links
Gem of the Mountains: 1956 University of Idaho yearbook – 1955 football season 
Go Mighty Vandals – 1955 football season
Idaho Argonaut – student newspaper – 1955 editions

Idaho
Idaho Vandals football seasons
Idaho Vandals football